3β-Dihydroprogesterone (3β-DHP), also known as 3β-hydroxyprogesterone, or pregn-4-en-3β-ol-20-one (4-pregnenolone, δ4-pregnenolone), is an endogenous steroid. It is biosynthesized by 3β-hydroxysteroid dehydrogenase from progesterone. Unlike 3α-dihydroprogesterone (3α-DHP), 3β-DHP does not act as a positive allosteric modulator of the GABAA receptor, which is in accordance with the fact that other 3β-hydroxylated progesterone metabolites such as isopregnanolone and epipregnanolone similarly do not act as potentiators of this receptor and instead inhibit it as well as reverse the effects of potentiators like allopregnanolone. 3β-DHP has been reported to possess about the same potency as progesterone in a bioassay of progestogenic activity, whereas 3α-DHP was not assessed.

See also
 5α-Dihydroprogesterone
 5β-Dihydroprogesterone
 3β-Androstanediol
 Pregnenolone
 Progesterone 3-acetyl enol ether
 Quingestrone

References

Sterols
Ketones
Pregnanes
Progestogens